The HEADstrong Foundation is a charitable, non-profit organization that offers financial, residential, and emotional support to families affected by cancer. The Foundation is based just outside of Philadelphia, where patients often travel seeking care and leaving their homes behind. The HEADstrong Foundation supports cancer patients and their families with peer support, comfort kits, financial help and lodging for families who have no place to stay while in the Philadelphia area.

The charity was founded in 2006 by Nicholas "Head" Colleluori, who was diagnosed with B-cell Non-Hodgkin's lymphoma during his sophomore year of college. Colleluori was a student-athlete playing men's lacrosse at NCAA Division 1 Hofstra University when he was diagnosed with large B-cell Non-Hodgkin's lymphoma. He had to leave Hofstra in order to undergo chemotherapy, radiation, a stem cell transplant, and other experimental treatments. He died in 2006, the same year the Foundation was started.

References

Bibliography

External links
 HEADstrong Official Website
 USILA HEADstrong Cancer Awareness Month
 HEADstrong Foundation: Our Impact
 Mount Saint Mary's University Men's Lacrosse Raises Over $7,000 for HEADstrong
 MLL Announces Burn Cancer Week Supporting HEADstrong Foundation

Cancer organizations based in the United States
Organizations established in 2006